Shaikh Saud bin Abdelaziz bin Hamad bin Abdullah bin Jassim bin Muhammed Al Thani (born 1949) is the cousin of Qatari ruler Hamad bin Khalifa Al Thani, grandson of Hamad bin Abdullah Al Thani and great-grandson of Abdullah bin Jassim Al Thani. Estimates of his net worth range from 3-12 billion USD.

Family

He has 3 wives and has 10 sons and 7 daughters.

 Roda bint Jassim bin Hamad bin Abdullah Al Thani (daughter of his uncle Jassim bin Hamad bin Abdullah Al Thani, granddaughter of Hamad bin Abdullah Al Thani)
 'Abdu'l-Aziz bin Sa'ud, married daughter of Fahad bin Abdulaziz bin Hamad, 1 son
 'Abdullah bin Sa'ud, married the daughter of Khalifa bin Hamad bin Abdullah, 3 son, 2 daughters
 Hamad bin Sa'ud, married daughter of Ali bin Jassim bin Fahad, 2 sons, 4 daughters
 Khalid bin Sa'ud, married daughter of Hamad bin Khalifa bin Hamad, 1 son, 3 daughters
 Muhammed bin Sa'ud, married daughter of (unknown), 1 son (Sa'ud ibn Muhamad)

 Pro. Shaikha bint Ahmed bin Saleh bin Majid Al Khulaifi Professor of Islamic History, Qatar University 
 Fahad bin Sa'ud 1 son (Abdulrahman bin Fahad), 3 daughters (Sheikha bint Fahad, Fatma bint Fahad, Nayla bint Fahad)
 Ali bin Sa'ud
 
 Lolwa bint Mohammed bin Hamad bin Abdullah Al Thani, (daughter of his uncle Mohammed bin Hamad bin Abdullah Al Thani and granddaughter of Hamad bin Abdullah Al Thani)
 Jassim bin Sa'ud
 Khalifa bin Sa'ud
 Ahmed bin Sa'ud

References

Saud bin Abdelaziz bin Hamad
Ambassadors of Qatar to Lebanon
Living people
Government ministers of Qatar
Year of birth missing (living people)